The 2006 Vaahteraliiga season was the 27th season of the highest level of American football in Finland. The regular season took place between May 36 and September 9, 2006. The Finnish champion was determined in the playoffs and at the championship game Vaahteramalja XXVII the Porvoo Butchers won the Helsinki Wolverines.

Standings

Playoffs

References 

American football in Finland
Vaahteraliiga
Vaahteraliiga